Ninth planet is a concept related to planets beyond Neptune.

Ninth planet or Planet Nine may also refer to:

Astronomy
 Neptune, 1979-1999 ninth planet when Pluto was classified as a planet and closer to the Sun
 Planet Nine, hypothetical ninth planet in the outer Solar System
 Pluto, ninth planet from its 1930 discovery until reclassified as a dwarf planet in 2006

Music
 Planet 9 (record label), founded by Mya

See also
 Tenth planet (disambiguation)
 Eleventh planet
 Twelfth planet (disambiguation) 
 Planet X (disambiguation)